Igor, or sometimes Ygor, is a stock character, a sometimes hunch-backed laboratory assistant to many types of Gothic villains or as a fiendish character who assists only himself, the latter most prominently portrayed by Bela Lugosi in Son of Frankenstein (1939) and The Ghost of Frankenstein (1942). He is familiar from many horror films and horror film parodies. He is traditionally associated with mad scientists, particularly Victor Frankenstein, although Frankenstein has neither a lab assistant nor any association with a character named Igor in the original Mary Shelley novel. The Igor of popular parlance is a composite character, based on characters created for the Universal Studios film franchise. In the first Frankenstein film (1931), Fritz served the role; in subsequent sequels, a different physically deformed character, Ygor, is featured, though Ygor is not an assistant in those films.

Origins
Dwight Frye's hunchbacked lab assistant in the first film of the Frankenstein series (1931) is the main source for the "Igor" of public imagination, though this character was actually named Fritz. Fritz did not originate from the Frankenstein novel, but instead originated from the earliest recorded play adaptation, Presumption; or, the Fate of Frankenstein, where he was played by Robert Keeley.

The third and fourth sequel films Son of Frankenstein (1939) and The Ghost of Frankenstein (1942) featured a character named Ygor portrayed by Bela Lugosi. This character is neither a hunchback nor a lab assistant, but a blacksmith with a broken neck and twisted back as the result of a botched hanging. He reanimates the Monster as an instrument of vengeance against the townspeople who attempted to hang him for grave robbing. He survives a near-fatal gunshot and appears in the next film in which his brain is placed in the Monster's body.

Universal Studios actively cemented the idea of the hunchbacked assistant to the "mad scientist" in the Frankenstein film series' The House of Frankenstein (1944) with J. Carrol Naish playing a hunchbacked lab assistant named Daniel.

In the horror film Mystery of the Wax Museum (1933), Ivan Igor is the name of the mad wax museum curator. The film was remade as House of Wax (1953), but the name Igor was given to the curator's henchman (Charles Bronson) rather than the curator himself. This character is deaf and mute, rather than a hunchback.

See also
 Igor (Young Frankenstein)
 Universal Monsters

References

External links
 Discussion of the popular 'Igor' idea
 
 The writing studio the art of writing and making films original innovation Van Helsing

Film characters introduced in 1939
Male stock characters
Fictional henchmen
Fictional hunchbacks
Frankenstein (Universal film series) characters
Male horror film villains
Fictional Serbian people